Scott Lake is a 77.5-acre all-sports lake in Waterford Township in Oakland County, Michigan.

The private, 35-ft deep lake, all-sports lake is spring fed and is entirely residential. It is located north of Scott Lake Rd. and west of Dixie Highway.

Namesake

Scott Lake was named for Spencer Scott (1792-1872) who, in 1846, settled on the banks of the lake that would bear his family name.  Scott came to the lake from his birthplace in Franklin, Sussex Co., New Jersey.

Fish
Fish in Scott Lake include bluegill, walleye, perch and rainbow trout.

References

Lakes of Oakland County, Michigan
Lakes of Michigan
Lakes of Waterford Township, Michigan